Two ships of the Polish Navy have been named ORP Piorun:

During the war she saw several engagements with U-boats and took part in the final battle of Bismarck. She was transferred back to the Royal Navy after the end of the war.
 , an  built in the German Democratic Republic for its navy and originally named Project 660.  After German reunification the unfinished hulls were bought by the Polish Navy and completed by Northern Shipyard in Gdańsk. Piorun is currently in service.  

Polish Navy ship names